The Deus ti salvet Maria (also known simply as the "Sardinian Hail Mary") is a devotional song belonging to the Sardinian tradition of the Gosos, written in Sardinian language in the 18th century by the poet Bonaventura Licheri (Neoneli, 1667–1733).
The lyrics were translated around 1725; the oldest transcription is the one of Maurizio Carrus, who had inserted it as an appendix in the Rosary of San Vero Milis in 1731. The Laude is sung in the form of the gosos, a typical devotional song widespread in Sardinia.

In 1974 Sardinian singer Maria Carta presented it to the general public on the Canzonissima television show; in 1987 she performed it at St. Patrick's Cathedral in New York, accompanied by a pipe organ.

Performers
Maria Teresa Cau
Maria Carta
Anna Loddo
Coro di Nuoro
Andrea Parodi with Tazenda
Mark Harris with Fabrizio De André
Savina Yannatou, arr. by Haris Lambrakis
Savina Yannatou with Elena Ledda
Franca Masu
Gianni Maroccolo with Ginevra Di Marco
Antonella Ruggiero 
Clara Murtas, arr. by Ennio Morricone

See also
Music of Sardinia

References

External links

interpretation of Maria Carta in Canzonissima (1974)

Marian hymns
Sardinian folk songs
18th-century hymns